Raymond Bley (19 February 1939 – 25 March 2012) was a Luxembourgian cyclist. He competed in the team time trial at the 1960 Summer Olympics.

References

External links
 

1939 births
2012 deaths
Luxembourgian male cyclists
Olympic cyclists of Luxembourg
Cyclists at the 1960 Summer Olympics
People from Pétange